Num-Torum (Numi-Torem or Numi-Turum) is the supreme god or father god of the Ugrian peoples. He is the father of the hero Mir-Susne-Hum, six other sons, including Postajankt-iki, and one daughter. His siblings are Hotel-Ekva (Sun), Etposzojka (Moon), Naj-Ekva (fire), Kuly-Otir (underworld) and his wife, Kaltes-Ekwa. According to the Khanty people, he lives on the highest level of heaven, which means that it is difficult for people to talk to him, thus the children of Num-Torum are consulted on his behalf. He and his seven sons lived in a house of gold and silver.

External links and references
"A rise of Mir-Susne-Hum." Graphic cycle dedicated to a national Ob-Ugrian (Ostyak - Hant and Vogul - Mansi) hero.
World view of the Hanti

Siberian deities
Ugrian mythology
Ob-Ugrian gods